is a district located in Nagasaki Prefecture, Japan.

As of August 1, 2011, the district has an estimated population of 16,270 and a density of 282 persons per km2. The total area is 57.76 km2.

Towns and villages
Ojika
Saza

Mergers
On April 1, 2005, the towns of Sechibaru and Yoshii merged into the city of Sasebo.
On October 1, 2005, the towns of Ikitsuki and Tabira, and the village of Ōshima merged into the city of Hirado.
On January 1, 2006, the towns of Fukushima and Takashima merged into the city of Matsuura.
On March 31, 2006, the towns of Kosaza and Uku merged into the city of Sasebo.
On March 31, 2010, the towns of Emukae and Shikamachi merged into the city of Sasebo.

References

Districts in Nagasaki Prefecture